Manithyris is a monotypic genus of brachiopods belonging to the family Frieleiidae. The only species is Manithyris rossi.

The species is found in Antarctica.

References

Brachiopod genera
Rhynchonellida
Monotypic brachiopod genera